Philippe Deleye (born 2 August 1962) is a Belgian former professional racing cyclist. He rode in one Cycling monument in his career the 1987 Milan–San Remo where he finished in 149th.

Major results
Sources:
1984
 1st Ronde van Vlaanderen Beloften
1985
 3rd GP Stad Zottegem
 6th Brussels–Ingooigem
1986
 6th Flèche Hesbignonne

References

External links
 

1962 births
Living people
Belgian male cyclists
Place of birth missing (living people)